Arkansas Highway 235 (AR 235 and Hwy. 235) is a north–south state highway in north central Arkansas. The route of  runs from US 65 in Pindall north through to Highway 14 in south Yellville.



Route description
The route begins at U.S. Route 65 near Pindall and runs northeast into Marion County. The highway serves Verona and has a junction with Highway 125 before entering Bruno. Highway 235 has a spur route in Bruno which runs south through the unincorporated community. The route continues northeast to Arkansas Highway 14 in Yellville, where the route terminates.

Major intersections

Bruno spur route

Arkansas Highway 235 Spur is a spur route in Bruno. The highway connects four National Register of Historic Places listings to the state highway system: Aggie Hall, Aggie Workshop, the Bruno School Building, and Hirst-Mathew Hall.

Major intersections

See also

 List of state highways in Arkansas

References

External links

235
Transportation in Marion County, Arkansas
Transportation in Searcy County, Arkansas